The broad-toothed rat (Mastacomys fuscus) is a species of rodent in the family Muridae.

Distribution and habitat
It is found only in South-eastern Australia. In Victoria live specimens have been caught in the Snowfields, Great Dividing Range (to Cooma in New South Wales), Gippsland Highlands, Otway Ranges and Wilsons Promontory. Specimens located in scats have been found in the Otway plains and East Gippsland. The species is also recorded in buttongrass sedgeland up to 1000 metres in western Tasmania.

Habitat preferences are areas of herbfields, grasslands and forests with minimal shrubs but a dense covering of sedge, grass, herbs and moss, where precipitation does not fall below 1400 mm per year in alpine areas and others 1000 mm at lower altitudes (DCNR 1995 pp. 208–210).

References

BROAD-TOOTHED RAT, MASTACOMYS FUSCUS (RODENTIA, MURIDAE), FOUND IN ALPINE HEATHLAND IN TASMANIA by MICHAEL M. DRIESSEN

External links

Mammals of Tasmania
Old World rats and mice
Mammals of New South Wales
Mammals of Victoria (Australia)
Rodents of Australia
Mammals described in 1882
Taxa named by Oldfield Thomas
Taxonomy articles created by Polbot